Guyana competed at the 2020 Summer Olympics in Tokyo. Originally scheduled to take place from 24 July to 9 August 2020, the Games were postponed to 23 July to 8 August 2021, because of the COVID-19 pandemic. It was the nation's eighteenth appearance at the Summer Olympics as an independent state, although it had previously represented in five other editions (1948 to 1964) under the name British Guiana. Guyana joined the African-led boycott of the 1976 Summer Olympics in Montreal.

Competitors
The following is the list of number of competitors participating in the Games:

Athletics

Guyanese athletes achieved the entry standards, either by qualifying time or by world ranking, in the following track and field events (up to a maximum of 3 athletes in each event):

Track & road events

Boxing

Guyana received an invitation from the Tripartite Commission to send the men's featherweight boxer Keevin Allicock to the Olympics, marking the country's return to the sport for the first time since Atlanta 1996.

Swimming

Guyana received a universality invitation from FINA to send two top-ranked swimmers (one per gender) in their respective individual events to the Olympics, based on the FINA Points System of June 28, 2021.

Table tennis
 
Guyana received an invitation from the Tripartite Commission to compete in the women's singles, signifying the nation's Olympic debut in the sport.

See also
Guyana at the 2019 Pan American Games

References

Nations at the 2020 Summer Olympics
2020
2021 in Guyanese sport